Tiloi is a constituency of the Uttar Pradesh Legislative Assembly covering the city of Tiloi in the Amethi district of Uttar Pradesh, India.

History 
Tiloi is one of five assembly constituencies in the Amethi Lok Sabha constituency. Since 2008, this assembly constituency is numbered 178 amongst 403 constituencies.

Currently, this seat belongs to Bharatiya Janta Party candidate Mayankeshwar Sharan Singh who won the Assembly election of 2017 Uttar Pradesh Legislative Elections by defeating Bahujan Samaj Party candidate Mohd. Saood by a margin of 44,047 votes.

References

External links
 

Assembly constituencies of Uttar Pradesh
Amethi district